Hyalopsora is a genus of fungi belonging to the family Pucciniastraceae.

The species of this genus are found in Europe, Japan and Northern America.

Species

Species:

Hyalopsora aculeata 
Hyalopsora adianti-capilli-veneris 
Hyalopsora aspidiotus

References

Pucciniales
Basidiomycota genera